Cordylecladia erecta is a species of red algae in the family Rhodymeniaceae. It is found in the north east Atlantic Ocean and the Mediterranean Sea and is the type species of the genus.

Description
Cordylecladia erecta grows in small tufts from a disc-like, rhizoidal, crustose base attached to rock but often hidden beneath the sand. These are solid, either unbranched or sparsely branched dichotomously and taper to points. The reproductive structures are only visible in winter and appear as enlarged, spindle-shaped areas near the ends of the fronds. This seaweed could be confused with Ahnfeltia plicata but that species is more bushy with wiry fronds that branch irregularly and are only  in diameter.

Distribution and habitat
Cordylecladia erecta occurs in the eastern Atlantic Ocean and the Mediterranean Sea. Its range extends from the Shetland Islands southwards but in the British Isles it is mostly found on the south and west coasts. It is found on the lower shore and subtidally, on rocks covered with sand.

Biology
The life cycle of Cordylecladia erecta involves an alternation of generations with both sexual and asexual phases. Female plants are recognisable by bunches of sterile hairs that develop first near the tips of the fronds and later extend to most of the rest of the frond. Carpogonia develop on short curved branches among these hairs. These structures liberate gametes into the water and after fertilisation, the zygotes settle to the seabed. These release tetraspores which develop into a new generation of gametophyte plants. It has been shown that the cycle is initiated by the short day conditions existing between October and April.

References

Rhodymeniales
Species described in 1852